Group D of the EuroBasket Women 2021 took place between 17 and 20 June 2021. The group consisted of Croatia, Czech Republic, France and Russia and played its games at the Rhénus Sport in Strasbourg, France.

Teams

Standings

Matches
All times are local (UTC+2).

Russia vs Czech Republic

France vs Croatia

Croatia vs Russia

Czech Republic vs France

Czech Republic vs Croatia

France vs Russia

References

External links
Official website

Group D
2020–21 in Belgian basketball
2020–21 in Slovenian basketball
2020–21 in Turkish basketball